Chapli is a rural locality (a selo) and the administrative center of Chaplinsky Selsoviet Rural Settlement, Kurchatovsky District, Kursk Oblast, Russia. Population:

Geography 
The selo is on the Reut River, 48 km south-west of Kursk, 10 km south-west of the district center – the town Kurchatov.

 Climate
Chapli has a warm-summer humid continental climate (Dfb in the Köppen climate classification).

Transport 
Chapli is located 2 km from the road of regional importance  (Kursk – Lgov – Rylsk – border with Ukraine), on the road of intermunicipal significance  (38K-017 – Chapli – Blagodatnoye), 3 km from the nearest railway station Blokhino (railway line Lgov I — Kursk).

The rural locality is situated 54 km from Kursk Vostochny Airport, 130 km from Belgorod International Airport and 256 km from Voronezh Peter the Great Airport.

References

Notes

Sources

Rural localities in Kurchatovsky District, Kursk Oblast